The Reigate and Banstead Residents' Association is a political party and residents' association in Reigate and Banstead, Surrey, England.

Its members are drawn from local associations, namely:
Nork Residents' Association
Tattenhams Residents Association

Election results

In the 2018 local elections, the Residents' Association returned 7 seats to Reigate and Banstead Borough Council.

References

Reigate and Banstead
Locally based political parties in England